Slaim (  also spelled Slim, Slem and Slaym) is a village in southern Syria, administratively part of the al-Suwayda Governorate, located north of al-Suwayda. Nearby localities include Attil to the west, Mardak and Shahba to the north and Qanawat to the southeast. According to the Syria Central Bureau of Statistics (CBS), Salim had a population of 2,129 in the 2004 census.

History
Inhabited in the Roman period, its ancient name was Selaema in Latin. In 1596 it appeared as Salam in the Ottoman tax registers, part of the nahiya (subdistrict) of Bani Nasiyya of the Hauran Sanjak. It had a population of 17 Muslim  households. Among the inhabitants were a group of settled Bedouin. The villagers paid a fixed tax rate of 20%  on wheat, barley, summer crops, goats and/or beehives, in addition to "occasional revenues"; a total of 4,800 akçe.

Salim was resettled by Druze in the 18th century. It was often used, according to explorer Johann Ludwig Burckhardt, by the local inhabitants to evade conscription or taxation by the Ottoman authorities. The Druze Banu Abu Assaf family historically inhabited and dominated the village.

In 1838 Eli Smith noted Salim as being located in Jebel Hauran, and inhabited by Druze and Christians.

Archaeology
Salim contains the ruins of a 2nd-century Roman temple. It was first surveyed in 1819 W. J. Bankes, then again in the early 20th century by Howard Crosby Butler and finally between 1980 and 1988 K. S. Freyberger. The temple has "a unique plan and its architectural decoration is quite rich", according to historian Ted Kaizer. It consists of a pronaos, a naos and an adyton. The building has a rectangular layout and was built on 2.4 meter high pavilion.

References

Bibliography

 

Populated places in as-Suwayda District
Archaeological sites in as-Suwayda Governorate
Roman sites in Syria
Villages in Syria
Druze communities in Syria